Strawberry pie is a dessert food consisting mainly of strawberries and sugar in a pie crust, sometimes with gelatin. It is often served with whipped cream.

Preparation 
Fresh strawberry pies are usually made with in-season sweet berries, while out-of-season strawberries are often better suited for baked pies. A double strawberry pie has glazed, uncooked strawberries on top, with a layer of cooked strawberries underneath.

A common question about strawberry pies is how to prevent the crust from becoming soggy or "runny". Possible causes of watery strawberry pies include the thickener, particularly when not enough cornstarch is used, or when it has lost its thickening properties after being cooked for too long. The strawberries themselves can contribute to wateriness if cut too finely. Some recipes add a cream cheese layer to help keep the pie crust crisp.

Consumption 
In the United States, strawberry pie is one of the red foods often served at Juneteenth celebrations, and is also a popular dessert at Fourth of July gatherings. 

Strawberry-pie eating contests are part of many summer strawberry festivals across America.  At the annual contest in Athens, Georgia, the 2017 winner ate five slices in 90 seconds. 

Each year in May in Huntington, West Virginia, Jim's Steak and Spaghetti House serves over 10,000 slices of strawberry pie for one week only, as thousands of customers line up outside its doors. Their strawberry pie, which consists of "fresh strawberries layered into a pie shell with confectionery sugar and real whipped cream", has received national recognition from People magazine and the Food Network.

Related desserts 
The main difference between a strawberry pie and a strawberry tart is the crust used. Strawberry pies have simple piecrusts and can be made quickly. Strawberry tarts, on the other hand, have a sweet pastry crust resembling a thin butter cookie, and take longer to make, with a pastry cream layer that needs to be chilled. Torta de morango is a commonly consumed dessert in Brazil.

A related dessert food is the strawberry-rhubarb pie, a baked pie which has a tendency to become "very juicy" or "soggy", due to the high water content of both the rhubarb and the strawberries.

Gallery

See also 

 List of strawberry dishes
 Strawberry cake
 Tart

References

External links 
 

Fruit pies
Strawberry dishes
American pies
Pies